Lieutenant-Colonel Henry Thomas Birch Reynardson  (24 February 1892 – 4 February 1972) was an officer in the Oxfordshire and Buckinghamshire Light Infantry of the British Army. He was the son of William John Birch Reynardson and married Diana Helen Ponsonby, daughter of the Hon. Edwin Charles William Ponsonby and Emily Dora Coope, on 14 September 1917.

References 

1892 births
1972 deaths
Oxfordshire and Buckinghamshire Light Infantry officers
Henry
High Sheriffs of Oxfordshire
Companions of the Order of St Michael and St George
British Army personnel of World War I